A Dying Machine is the fourth studio album and first concept album by American heavy metal band Tremonti. It was released on June 8, 2018 via Napalm Records. The record was produced by Michael "Elvis" Baskette, who produced Tremonti's past three records and also produced Alter Bridge's records. The album is accompanied by a full-length novel under the same name written by Mark Tremonti and John Shirley, tying together loose ends of the album's plot. Frontman Mark Tremonti stated that the album is the most dynamic and diverse in his entire catalog. The album's first radio single, "Take You with Me", was released April 16, 2018. The single peaked at number 32 on the US Billboard Mainstream Rock Songs chart in June 2018.

Track listing

Personnel 
Tremonti
 Mark Tremonti – lead guitar, lead vocals, arrangement
 Eric Friedman – rhythm guitar, bass, backing vocals, arrangement, strings, keyboards, programming
 Garrett Whitlock – drums, arrangement

Additional musicians
 Michael "Elvis" Baskette – arrangement, strings, keyboards, programming
 Jef Moll – arrangement, strings, keyboards, programming

Production
 Michael "Elvis" Baskette – producer
 Josh Saldate – assistant engineer
 Jef Moll – engineer, digital editing
 Jeremy Frost – guitar technician
 Daniel Tremonti – creative direction
 Ted Jensen – mastering
 Adam Grover – mastering assistant

Charts

References

2018 albums
Mark Tremonti albums
Napalm Records albums
Albums produced by Michael Baskette